= Kumbhargaon =

Village in Maharashtra

- village
- Location in Maharashtra, India Kumbhargaon (India)
- Country: India
- State: Maharashtra
- District: Satara district

Languages
  - Official: Marathi
- Time zone: UTC+5:30 (IST)

Kumbhargaon is a village in the Patan taluka of Satara district in Maharashtra state, India.

== Demographics ==
Covering 1,966 hectares (4,860 acres) and comprising 394 households at the time of the 2011 census of India, Kumbhargaon had a population of 1808. There were 913 males and 895 females, with 222 people being aged six or younger.
